Bath is a town  in Steuben County, New York, United States, with an area of 96.3 square miles (249 km2) and a population of 11,426 in 2020. Its largest settlement is the Village of Bath, which has an area of 2.9 sq mi (7.5 km2) and a population of 5,641 (in 2000). The Village is the county seat of Steuben County. The Town is located in the central part of the county, northwest of Elmira. The town and village are either named after the city of Bath in England or after Lady Bath, daughter of a landowner.

History

The town was founded in 1793 and was part of a land investment by wealthy Briton William Pulteney, and named after Bath, Somerset in England, where he owned extensive estates. It was created along with Steuben County in 1796 and became a mother town of the county, eventually yielding land to seven later towns.  The Lackawanna Railroad opened its mainline through Bath, and opened a station, in 1882.

Geography
The United States Census Bureau lists the town's total area as 96.3 square miles (249.4 km2), of which 96.0 square miles (248.6 km2)  is land and 0.3 square mile (0.8 km2)(0.32%)  is water.

Interstate 86 (Southern Tier Expressway) passes through the town. New York State Route 54 and New York State Route 415 intersect in Bath village. New York State Route 53 has its southern terminus at NY-415 in the community of Kanona. New York State Route 226 passes through Savona.

The Cohocton River flows through the town past the hamlet of Kanona and the villages of Bath and Savona.

Communities and Locations in the Town of Bath
Bath – The Village of Bath.
Buck Settlement – A hamlet in the southwestern part of the town.
Coss Corners – A location south of Unionville on County Road 10.
Dudley Settlement – A hamlet south of Bath village, lying between Unionville and East Union.
East Union – A hamlet south of Bath village.
Haverling Heights – A community bordering the northern side of Bath village.
Kanona – A hamlet northwest of Bath village by Interstate 86.  The village is centered on the intersection of NY-53, NY-415 and County Road 14.
Knight Settlement – A location in the northwestern part of the town on County Road 15.
Savona – The Village of Savona.
Sonora – A hamlet by the eastern town line.
Thomas Corners – A location in the southwestern part of the town.
Unionville – A hamlet south of Bath village on County Road 10.

Climate
This climatic region is typified by large seasonal temperature differences, with warm to hot (and often humid) summers and cold (sometimes severely cold) winters.  According to the Köppen Climate Classification system, Bath has a humid continental climate, abbreviated "Dfb" on climate maps.

Demographics

As of the census of 2000, there were 12,097 people, 4,905 households, and 3,050 families residing in the town. The population density was 126.0 people per square mile (48.7/km2). There were 5,402 housing units at an average density of 56.3 per square mile (21.7/km2). The racial makeup of the town was 96.04% White, 1.79% Black or African American, 0.30% Native American, 0.71% Asian, 0.03% Pacific Islander, 0.10% from other races, and 1.03% from two or more races. Hispanic or Latino of any race were 0.70% of the population.

There were 4,905 households, out of which 28.5% had children under the age of 18 living with them, 45.5% were married couples living together, 11.9% had a female householder with no husband present, and 37.8% were non-families. 31.6% of all households were made up of individuals, and 14.8% had someone living alone who was 65 years of age or older. The average household size was 2.34 and the average family size was 2.90.

In the town, the population was spread out, with 23.4% under the age of 18, 7.7% from 18 to 24, 25.9% from 25 to 44, 24.5% from 45 to 64, and 18.5% who were 65 years of age or older. The median age was 41 years. For every 100 females, there were 101.7 males. For every 100 females age 18 and over, there were 98.5 males.

The median income for a household in the town was $32,508, and the median income for a family was $39,625. Males had a median income of $30,456 versus $25,160 for females. The per capita income for the town was $16,939. About 10.5% of families and 14.5% of the population were below the poverty line, including 19.5% of those under age 18 and 7.5% of those age 65 or over.

Economy
It is the site of Bath VA Medical Center, established in 1877 and dedicated in 1879 as New York State Soldiers' and Sailors' Home.  It is adjacent to the Bath National Cemetery.

Arts and culture
Bath has an annual dairy festival in June to celebrate the strong dairy-based economy of the area.

Notable people
 George Brinski (alternatively spelled Beniski, Benninsky, and Brinske), Civil War substitute for future president Grover Cleveland
 Joseph James DeAngelo, serial killer
Richard William Davis, child killer

References

External links
Official Town of Bath website
Bath information

Towns in Steuben County, New York